The 2016 Southland Conference men's basketball tournament, a part of the 2015–16 NCAA Division I men's basketball season, took place March 9–12 at the Merrell Center in Katy, Texas.  The winner of the tournament will receive the Southland Conference's automatic bid to the 2016 NCAA tournament.

Two programs in their third year of the transition from NCAA Division II to Division I, Abilene Christian and Incarnate Word, were ineligible for the tournament.  In addition, Central Arkansas was ineligible for the tournament for failure to meet enhanced NCAA Academic Performance Rating (APR) requirements.

Seeds
The top 8 teams in the conference qualified for the tournament. The top 2 seeds earned double byes into the Semifinals. The #3 and #4 seeds received a single buy to the Quarterfinals.

Teams were seeded by record within the division and conference, with a tiebreaker system to seed teams with identical conference records.

Schedule

Bracket

* – denotes overtime period

Game summaries

First round

Quarterfinals

Semifinals

Championship

Awards and honors
Source: 
Tournament MVP: Thomas Walkup

All-Tournament Team:

 Hameed Ali (Texas A&M–CC)
 Demetrious Floyd (Stephen F. Austin)
 Thomas Walkup (Stephen F. Austin) (MVP)
 Clide Geffrard (Stephen F. Austin)
 Jordan Capps (Southeastern Louisiana)

See also
2016 Southland Conference women's basketball tournament

References

External links
  2016 Southland Conference Men's and Women's Basketball Tournament Page

Southland Conference men's basketball tournament
2015–16 Southland Conference men's basketball season
Southland Conference men's basketball
Sports competitions in Katy, Texas
College basketball tournaments in Texas